Daria Dmitrievna Kachanova (born 17 September 1997) is a Russian speed skater who specializes in the sprint distances.

Career
Kachanova won the 2015/2106 ISU Junior World Cup title at the 500 m event. In March 2016 she won the gold medal in the 500m at the 2016 World Junior Championships in Changchun, China.

At the second competition weekend of the 2018–19 ISU Speed Skating World Cup she finished third in the second 500m event behind Nao Kodaira and Vanessa Herzog. At the second competition weekend she finished third in the first 500 m event as well as in the 1000 m event.

World Cup podiums

Source: ISU

Personal records

References

External links

TheSports.org profile
Eurosport profile

1997 births
Russian female speed skaters
Living people
Sportspeople from Nizhny Novgorod
World Single Distances Speed Skating Championships medalists
Speed skaters at the 2022 Winter Olympics
Olympic speed skaters of Russia
21st-century Russian women